Lesencetomaj is a village in Veszprém county, Hungary.

See also 
 Maria Tolmay

References

External links 
 Street map (Hungarian)
 

Populated places in Veszprém County